is the first single released by Fabri Fibra from his third solo studio album Tradimento, released in 2006.

Videoclip
The video for "Applausi per Fibra", was directed by Cosimo Alema. The video sees alternating in front of the camera, to whom they are directed, Fibra, Fish, Nesli and others, including even the dancers from the white face and the "X" on black eyes and mouth, which also accompanied the singer in his performances live. Catchphrase in the video is the shirt worn by all characters in the video, with the words "Io odio Fabri Fibra" (I hate Fabri Fibra).

Charts and certifications

Charts

Certifications

References 

2006 singles
Fabri Fibra songs
2006 songs
Songs written by Fabri Fibra